Hurşut Meriç (born 31 July 1983) is a Dutch professional footballer who last played for Turkish club Cizrespor. Meriç plays primarily as a left winger.

Career
Born in Amsterdam, Meriç has played for Türkiyemspor, ADO Den Haag, Gençlerbirliği, Çaykur Rizespor, Adana Demirspor, 
Karacabey Belediyespor and Cizrespor.

While playing for Türkiyemspor he won the Hoofdklasse title, as well as the KNVB Amateur Cup.

References

1983 births
Living people
Dutch footballers
Footballers from Amsterdam
Dutch people of Turkish descent
FC Türkiyemspor players
ADO Den Haag players
Gençlerbirliği S.K. footballers
Çaykur Rizespor footballers
Adana Demirspor footballers
Karacabey Belediyespor footballers
Eerste Divisie players
Eredivisie players
Süper Lig players
Association football wingers
Dutch expatriate footballers
Dutch expatriate sportspeople in Turkey
Expatriate footballers in Turkey